The Karnataka State Film Awards 1986–87, presented by Government of Karnataka, to felicitate the best of Kannada Cinema released in the year 1986.

Lifetime achievement award
From this year a new award namely Puttanna Kanagal Award is introduced to honor the Directors of Kannada Cinema.

Film Awards

Other Awards

References

Karnataka State Film Awards